Heidi Karin Kozak is a Danish actress. She appeared in several late-1980s horror films, including Slumber Party Massacre II (1987), Friday the 13th Part VII: The New Blood (1988), and Society (1989).  She appears in the behind-the-scenes documentary Sleepless Nights: Revisiting the Slumber Party Massacres.  In the first season of Dr. Quinn Medicine Woman, she had the supporting role of Emily Donovan.  She left the series after becoming pregnant and choosing to focus on motherhood.

Filmography

Film

Television

References

External links
 
 

Living people
Actresses from Copenhagen
Danish film actresses
Danish television actresses
21st-century Danish actresses
Year of birth missing (living people)